KXBX-FM (98.3 MHz) is a radio station broadcasting a hot adult contemporary format. Licensed to Lakeport, California, United States, the station is currently owned by Bicoastal Media Licenses, LLC and features programming from Westwood One.

History

The station went on the air as KXBX on 1984-12-14.

References

External links

XBX-FM
Lakeport, California
Ukiah, California
Hot adult contemporary radio stations in the United States
Radio stations established in 1984